Klimenki is a rural locality (a selo) and the administrative center of Klimenkovskoye Rural Settlement, Veydelevsky District, Belgorod Oblast, Russia. The population was 741 as of 2010. There are 4 streets.

Geography 
Klimenki is located 20 km southwest of Veydelevka (the district's administrative centre) by road. Yaropoltsy is the nearest rural locality.

References 

Rural localities in Veydelevsky District